The Flory–Schulz distribution is a discrete probability distribution named after Paul Flory and Günter Victor Schulz that describes the relative ratios of polymers of different length that occur in an ideal step-growth polymerization process. The probability mass function (pmf)  for the mass fraction of chains of length  is:
.

In this equation, k is the number of monomers in the chain, and 0<a<1 is an empirically determined constant related to the fraction of unreacted monomer remaining.

The form of this distribution implies is that shorter polymers are favored over longer ones -the chain length is  geometrically distributed. Apart from polymerization processes, this distribution is also relevant to the Fischer–Tropsch process that is conceptually related, in that lighter hydrocarbons are converted to heavier hydrocarbons that are desirable as a liquid fuel.

The pmf of this distribution is a solution of the following equation:

References

Polymers
Continuous distributions